HMS Vesuve was the French brick-cannonière Vésuve, name vessel of her class of seven bricks-cannonière. She was launched at Saint-Malo in 1793. The British Royal Navy captured her in 1795 and took her into service as HMS Vesuve. The Navy sold her in 1802.

French career
The cannonière Vésuve was under the command of lieutenant de vaisseau non entretenu Desguetz on 22 October 1793. She had been stationed in the bay of Cancale, then at Cap Fréhel. She escorted convoys between Granville and Aber Benoît.

Between 9 January and 21 September 1794, Vésuve was still under Desguetz's command. (During this period he received promotion to lieutenant de vaisseau.) She escorted convoys between Paimpol and Granville, and conducted liaison missions between Granville and Saint-Malo. She was successively stationed at Hébihens, Cancale, and Bréhat Roads.

Between 4 February and her capture Vésuve was under the command of lieutenant de vaisseau non entretenu Nicholas Guidelou. She escorted convoys between Saint-Malo and the island of Bréhat, and was stationed at the Bay of Paimpol.

Capture
On 3 July 1795 Melampus and  intercepted a convoy of 13 vessels off St Malo. Melampus captured an armed brig and Hebe captured six merchant vessels: Maria Louisa, Abeille, Bon Foi, 
Patrouille, Eleonore, and Pecheur. The brig of war was armed with four 24-pounders and had a crew of 60 men. Later she was identified as the 4-gun Vésuve. The convoy had been on its way from Île-de-Bréhat to Brest. The Royal Navy took Vésuve into service under her existing name.

Royal Navy career
The Navy commissioned Vesuve in September 1795 under the command of Lieutenant Henry Garrett, for The Downs. In 1797 Lieutenant William Elliot replaced Garrett. In May 1798 she participated in the expedition to Ostend. In August 1799 Vesuve escorted a convoy of 14 vessels from Embden to Hull.

In 1801 Lieutenant Benjamin Crispin sailed Vesuve for the Baltic.

Fate
The "Principal Officers and Commissioners of His Majesty's Navy" offered "Vesuve Gun-Vessel, 160 Tons, Copper-bottomed and Copper Braces and Pintles, lying at Sheerness" for sale on 1 December 1802. The Royal Navy sold Vesuve on that day.

Notes, citations, and references
Notes

Citations

References
 Fonds Marine. Campagnes (opérations; divisions et stations navales; missions diverses). Inventaire de la sous-série Marine BB4. Tome premier: BB4 1 à 482 (1790-1826) 
 Schomberg, Isaac (1802) Naval Chronology, Or an Historical Summary of Naval and Maritime Events from the Time of the Romans, to the Treaty of Peace 1802: With an Appendix. (London: T. Egerton).

External links
 

1793 ships
Ships built in France
Ships of the French Navy
Gunboats of the Royal Navy
Captured ships
Vésuve-class gunbrigs